We Came, We Saw... is an album of compiled live tracks by the Welsh rock band Budgie, collected from their performances at the Reading Festival in 1980 and 1982, with an emphasis on songs released during that period rather than the band's older, more well-known work. Heavier Than Air - Rarest Eggs is a companion to this album. These tracks were later included, along with others, on the 2006 collection The BBC Recordings.

Track listing
Disc 1:
"Breaking All the House Rules"
"Crime Against the World"
"Napoleon Bonaparte"
"Forearm Smash"
"Panzer Division Destroyed!"
"Wildfire"
"Breadfan"

Disc 2:
"Forearm Smash"
"Crime Against the World"
"I Turned to Stone"
"Truth Drug"
"Superstar"
"She Used Me Up"
"Panzer Division Destroyed"

References

Budgie (band) live albums
1998 live albums